The Mist (also known as Stephen King's The Mist) is a 2007 American science-fiction horror film based on the 1980 novella The Mist by Stephen King. The film was written and directed by Frank Darabont. Darabont had been interested in adapting The Mist for the big screen since the 1980s. The film features an ensemble cast, including Thomas Jane, Marcia Gay Harden, Nathan Gamble, Andre Braugher, Sam Witwer, Toby Jones, Frances Sternhagen, Buck Taylor, Robert Treveiler, William Sadler, Alexa Davalos, David Jensen, Chris Owen, Andy Stahl, and future The Walking Dead stars Jeffrey DeMunn, Laurie Holden, Melissa McBride, and Juan Gabriel Pareja.

The director revised the ending of the film to be darker than the novella's ending, a change to which King was amenable. Darabont also sought unique creature designs to differentiate them from his creatures in past films. Although a monster movie, the central theme explores what ordinary people are driven to do under extraordinary circumstances. The plot revolves around members of the small town of Bridgton, Maine, who after a severe thunderstorm causes the power to go out the night before, meet in a supermarket to pick up supplies. While they struggle to survive, an unnatural mist envelops the town and conceals vicious, Lovecraftian monsters as extreme tensions rise among the survivors.

Filming of The Mist began in Shreveport, Louisiana in February 2007. The film was released in the United States and Canada on November 21, 2007; it performed well at the box office and received positive reviews. 

Darabont has since revealed that he had "always had it in mind to shoot The Mist in black and white", a decision inspired by such films as Night of the Living Dead (1968) and the pre-color work of Ray Harryhausen. While the film's theatrical release was in color, the director has described the black-and-white print (released on DVD and Blu-ray in 2008) as his "preferred version."

Plot
A severe thunderstorm strikes Bridgton, Maine, causing a tree to fall into the lakeside home of artist David Drayton, his wife Stephanie, and their eight-year-old son Billy. While surveying the damage the next morning, they notice a thick mist advancing over the lake. David and Billy leave for the town with their neighbor Brent Norton to buy supplies.

From inside the supermarket, they watch police cars speed down the street. A terrified local, Dan Miller, runs into the store and warns of a danger lurking in the mist. As a civil alert siren sounds, store managers Ollie Weeks and Bud Brown close off the supermarket, and the mist envelops the store. One woman leaves to go home to her children.

Against David's advice, bagger Norm starts to go outside to fix the store's emergency generator, but he is grabbed by a tentacled creature and dragged into the mist. David and Ollie direct the customers to barricade the storefront windows. Mrs. Carmody, a religious woman, begins preaching about an impending Armageddon. Brent disbelieves the dangers of the mist and leaves the store with a small group to seek outside help. His group is attacked by an unseen force and presumably killed.

David forms connections with several people in the store, including Amanda Dunfrey and Irene Reppler, two teachers who came into conflict with Carmody over her religious take on the ongoing disaster. Amanda carries a revolver in her purse and gives it to Ollie, who is a former regional shooting champion. As night falls, enormous flying insects, attracted to the lights, swarm to the store windows and are preyed on by pterodactyl-like creatures. One of the predators (Including big locusts) smashes a window, allowing both species inside. In the ensuing panic, two people are killed while another receives fatal burns while attempting to incinerate the insects. Meanwhile, Carmody is miraculously spared from an insect, which convinces her to proselytize more fervently and gain followers among the survivors.

A small group led by David goes to the neighboring pharmacy in search of medical supplies but is attacked by giant spiders that kill two men, forcing them to retreat. Carmody, who had opposed the expedition, uses this failure to increase her influence by offering protection from divine wrath to new converts.

The next day, following the suicides of two soldiers from the local military base, a third soldier, Jessup, reveals that a government project to discover other dimensions was underway at the base and that scientists accidentally opened a doorway into the creatures' habitat. Angered and vengeful, Carmody's followers offer Jessup as a sacrifice and expel him from the supermarket. Outside, he is immediately devoured by a giant praying mantis-like creature.

As David and his group prepare to leave the store the next morning, they are stopped by Carmody. Billy has been chosen by her group to be delivered as the next sacrifice to appease the monsters. As the crowd descends on Amanda and Billy, Ollie shoots and kills Carmody. The traumatized survivors then allow the group to leave. As the group makes its way through the parking lot, Ollie is devoured by the praying-mantis like creature, while two others are killed by the spider-creatures from the pharmacy. Bud runs back to the store and is let inside by the patrons. David, Billy, Dan, Amanda, and Irene reach David's car and leave.

Driving through the mist, David finds his home destroyed and Stephanie dead. Devastated, he drives away from town, passing a colossal six-legged beast and eventually running out of gas. With no means of escaping the mist, the adults decide to end their lives. Aiding their suicide, David shoots Billy and the other three survivors with his four remaining bullets before leaving the car to be taken by the creatures. The mist suddenly dissipates, revealing the vanguard of a U.S. Army armored column beginning the process of exterminating the creatures and restoring order. David, seeing that the Army has also rescued survivors, including the woman who left to get to her children, realizes that he killed his son and fellow survivors as they were just moments away from rescue. He drops to his knees, screaming in despair.

Cast
 Thomas Jane as David Drayton, a painter who ends up trapped in the supermarket with his son Billy
 Marcia Gay Harden as Mrs. Carmody, a religious fanatic who believes the mist to be the wrath of God
 Laurie Holden as Amanda Dunfrey, a new teacher at the local school. She carries a Colt revolver with her at all times
 Andre Braugher as Brent Norton, a big-city attorney and David's neighbor
 Toby Jones as Ollie Weeks, the supermarket's assistant manager, who is experienced with guns
 William Sadler as Jim Grondin, a belligerent and weak-minded mechanic
 Jeffrey DeMunn as Dan Miller, who takes shelter in the market after witnessing the dangers from the mist
 Frances Sternhagen as Irene Reppler, an elderly teacher and Amanda's co-worker
 Sam Witwer as Private Wayne Jessup, a soldier stationed at the nearby Arrowhead military base
 Alexa Davalos as Sally, a cashier at the supermarket and Billy's babysitter
 Nathan Gamble as Billy Drayton, David's eight-year-old son
 Chris Owen as Norm, a bag boy
 Robert Treveiler as Bud Brown, the supermarket's manager
 David Jensen as Myron LaFleur, a mechanic who works with Jim
 Melissa McBride as an unnamed woman who left her kids alone at home
 Andy Stahl as Mike Hatlen, a supermarket patron who sides with David's group
 Buck Taylor as Ambrose Cornell, a supermarket patron who sides with David's group
 Juan Gabriel Pareja as Morales, a soldier from Arrowhead base
 Walter Fauntleroy as Donaldson, a soldier from Arrowhead base
 Brandon O'Dell as Bobby Eagleton, a supermarket patron who sides with David's group
 Jackson Hurst as Joe Eagleton, Bobby's brother
 Susan Watkins as Hattie Turman, a local real estate agent
 Mathew Greer as Silas, a supermarket patron who sides with Brent's group
 Kelly Collins Lintz as Stephanie Drayton, David's wife and Billy's mother
 Ron Clinton Smith as Mr. Mackey, the supermarket's butcher
 Amin Joseph as a military police officer

Production

Development
Director Frank Darabont first read Stephen King's 1980 novella "The Mist" in the Dark Forces anthology, and originally expressed interest in directing a film adaptation for his directing debut. He instead filmed The Shawshank Redemption, also based on another King novella. In October 1994, after completing The Shawshank Redemption, Darabont reiterated his interest in filming "The Mist". Darabont did not immediately follow through, instead directing the 1999 film adaptation of Stephen King's The Green Mile. Darabont eventually set up a first-look deal for The Mist with Paramount Pictures, having been entrusted feature-film rights by Stephen King. By December 2004, Darabont said that he had begun writing an adapted screenplay for The Mist, and by October 2006, the project moved from Paramount to Dimension Films, with Darabont attached to direct and actor Thomas Jane in negotiations to join the cast.

Writing

Director Darabont chose to film The Mist after filming the "straighter dramas" The Shawshank Redemption and The Green Mile because he "wanted to make a very direct, muscular kind of film". Darabont conceived of a new ending in translating the novella for the big screen. Author King praised Darabont's new ending, describing it as one that would be unsettling for studios. King said, "The ending is such a jolt—wham! It's frightening. But people who go to see a horror movie don't necessarily want to be sent out with a Pollyanna ending."

Darabont described The Mist as quaint in its elements of monsters and fear of the unknown compared to the contemporary popularity of films with torture porn. The director saw The Mist as a throwback to Paddy Chayefsky and William Shakespeare, explaining, "It's people at each other." He highlighted the element of fear in the film in how it compelled people to behave differently. Darabont said, "How primitive do people get? It's Lord of the Flies that happens to have some cool monsters in it." He also drew parallels to The Twilight Zone episode "The Monsters Are Due on Maple Street" and the 1944 film Lifeboat.

In the novella, the character David Drayton—who is married—has a sexual encounter with Amanda Dumfries, who is also married. Darabont did not want to attempt conveying on screen the protagonist being involved in an extramarital affair. The characters in the film, portrayed by Thomas Jane and Laurie Holden, instead share a more emotional relationship. Jane explained, "We kind of form a little family, sort of surrogate family where my son and I'm a father and she becomes the mother to the son. We become a little unit as we're trying to get through this nightmare together." Holden compared the nightmare to what refugees experienced at the Louisiana Superdome during Hurricane Katrina.

While the origin of the mist in the original novella is never explained in great detail, the movie features a soldier explaining how the Arrowhead Project experimented with opening portals to other worlds. Frank Darabont wrote, but did not film, an opening scene in a draft dated August 5, 2005, in which the thunderstorm causes a malfunction at the Arrowhead Project's lab that allows the portal to another dimension to stay open too long.

Production
In December 2006, Jane finalized negotiations with the studio to join the cast. In January 2007, actors Andre Braugher and Laurie Holden joined Jane for the cast of The Mist. Production began the following February at StageWorks of Louisiana, a sound stage and film production facility in Shreveport, Louisiana. Marcia Gay Harden and Toby Jones joined the cast later in the month.

William Sadler, Jeffrey DeMunn, and Brian Libby, each of whom appeared in Darabont's previous Stephen King adaptations The Shawshank Redemption and The Green Mile, were cast in supporting roles. Sadler had previously played Jane's role, David Drayton, in a 1986 audiobook version of "The Mist". Darabont wanted to cast King in the supporting role that eventually went to Brian Libby, an offer that King turned down because he did not want to travel to film the part.

Darabont sought to pursue "a more fluid, ragged documentary kind of direction" with The Mist, so he contacted the camera crew from the television series The Shield, after having directed one episode, to use their style in the film. Darabont attempted to film The Mist digitally but found that it "wound up looking too beautiful". He instead chose to film with 400 ASA from Fujifilm, which gave footage a grainy effect.

In the opening shot, David is seen finishing a painting based on King's Dark Tower series, which was painted by film poster designer Drew Struzan. Darabont also included reproductions of Struzan's posters and illustrations for The Shawshank Redemption, The Green Mile, John Carpenter's The Thing, and Guillermo del Toro's Pan's Labyrinth. Struzan went on to produce a poster for The Mist, but this image was not used in the film's marketing campaign.

Darabont collaborated with the production designer to create a mix of eras to avoid appearing as a period piece, but also not looking so contemporary. Cell phones were used by characters in The Mist, but the military police in the film did not dress in modern attire. While an MP drives an old Jeep instead of a Humvee, other cars seen in the film are modern models. The city police cars in the beginning of the film are a 1987 Chevrolet Caprice and a 1988 Ford LTD Crown Victoria, cars that were standard police vehicles in the late 1980s, but have not been used in force since the late 1990s.

Over 100 extras from Shreveport, Louisiana, were used in The Mist. Unlike conventional application of extras in the background of a film, 60 extras were interwoven with the film's ensemble cast. Additional elements giving the film a local flavor include the prominence of local Louisiana brands such as Zapp's potato chips. Exterior shots of the house at the beginning were in Shreveport. Exterior shots of the supermarket were in Vivian, Louisiana. Shields on the  passing firetrucks early in the film identify them as part of the Caddo Parish fire department.

Music
Darabont chose to use music to minimal effect in The Mist to capture the "heavier feel" of the darker ending he had written to replace the one from the novella. The director explained, "Sometimes movie music feels false. I've always felt that silent can be scarier than loud, a whisper more frightening than a bang, and we wanted to create a balance. We kept music to a minimum to keep that vérité, documentary feel." Darabont chose to overlay the song "The Host of Seraphim" by the band Dead Can Dance, a spiritual piece characterized by wailing and chanting. As a fan of Dead Can Dance, Darabont thought that the song played "as a requiem mass for the human race." The original score was composed by Academy Award-nominated composer Mark Isham.

Effects
Darabont hired artists Jordu Schell and Bernie Wrightson to assist in designing the creatures for the film. Greg Nicotero worked on the film's creature design and make-up effects, while Everett Burrell served as the visual effects supervisor. Nicotero initially sketched out ideas for creature design when Darabont originally expressed interest in filming The Mist in the 1980s. When the project was greenlit, Nicotero, Burrell, and Darabont collaborated on the creature design at round-table meetings at CaféFX. The studio for visual effects had been recommended to Darabont by Guillermo del Toro after Darabont asked the director who created the visual effects for Pan's Labyrinth.

Because the creatures were described in only a few sentences in the novella, Darabont sought to create new designs, but specifically designs which felt unique. Nicotero, who was versed in film and genre history, reviewed past creature designs to avoid duplicating earlier screen monsters. When the designs were completed, Nicotero and Burrell educated the cast on the appearance of the creatures by showing them puppets and the function of their eyes and mouths. The puppet demonstrations served as reference points for the cast, who had to respond to motion-capture dots during filming.

Release
The Mist was screened at the film festival ShowEast on October 18, 2007, at which Darabont received the Kodak Award for Excellence in Filmmaking for his previous works The Shawshank Redemption and The Green Mile.

Critical reception
On Rotten Tomatoes, 71% of critics have given the film a positive review based on 147 reviews, with an average rating of 6.60/10. The site's critics consensus reads, "Frank Darabont's impressive camerawork and politically incisive script make The Mist a truly frightening experience." On Metacritic, the film holds a weighted average score of 58 out of 100 based on 29 reviews, indicating "mixed or average reviews". Audiences polled by CinemaScore gave the film a "C" on scale of A to F.

James Berardinelli wrote of the film, "The Mist is what a horror film should be—dark, tense, and punctuated by just enough gore to keep the viewer's flinch reflex intact. ... Finally, after a long list of failures, someone has done justice in bringing one of King's horror stories to the screen. Though definitely not the feel-good movie of the season, this is a must-see for anyone who loves the genre and doesn't demand 'torture porn' from horror." 
Michael Phillips of the Chicago Tribune praised the film: "Good and creepy, The Mist comes from a Stephen King novella and is more the shape, size and quality of the recent 1408, likewise taken from a King story, than anything in the persistently fashionable charnel house inhabited by the "Saw" and "Hostel" franchises.
Entertainment Weekly's Lisa Schwarzbaum wrote "There's a grim modern parable to be read into the dangerous effects of the gospel-preaching local crazy lady Mrs. Carmody (brilliantly played by a hellfire Marcia Gay Harden) on a congregation of the fearful."
Tom Ambrose of Empire said the film was "criminally overlooked" and "one of the best horror movies of the last few years."

Roger Ebert wrote a mixed review, giving it 2 stars out of 4: "If you have seen ads or trailers suggesting that horrible things pounce on people, and they make you think you want to see this movie, you will be correct. It is a competently made Horrible Things Pouncing on People movie. If you think Frank Darabont has equaled the Shawshank and Green Mile track record, you will be sadly mistaken." Justin Chang of Variety gave a mixed review, and wrote: "Much nastier and less genteel than his best-known Stephen King adaptations (The Shawshank Redemption, The Green Mile), Frank Darabont's screw-loose doomsday thriller works better as a gross-out B-movie than as a psychological portrait of mankind under siege, marred by one-note characterizations and a tone that veers wildly between snarky and hysterical."

Accolades
Bloody Disgusting ranked the film number four on their list of the "Top 20 Horror Films of the Decade", with the article saying "The scary stuff works extremely well, but what really drives this one home is Darabont's focus on the divide that forms between two factions of the townspeople—the paranoid, Bible-thumping types and the more rational-minded, decidedly left-wing members of the populace. This allegorical microcosm of G. W. Bush-era America is spot on, and elevates an already-excellent film to even greater heights."

The film was nominated for three Saturn Awards; Best Horror Film, Best Director, and a win for Best Supporting Actress for Harden.

Box office
The film was commercially released in the United States and Canada on November 21, 2007. Over the opening weekend in the United States and Canada, The Mist grossed $8,931,973. As of August 9, 2009, the film grossed $25,593,755 in the United States and Canada and $27,560,960 in other territories for a worldwide total of $57,289,103.

Home media
The Mist was released on DVD and Blu-ray on March 25, 2008. The single disc includes an audio commentary by writer/director Frank Darabont, eight deleted scenes with optional commentary, and "A Conversation With Stephen King and Frank Darabont" featurette.

The two-disc edition includes the exclusive black-and-white presentation of the film, as well as the color version, and five featurettes ("When Darkness Came: The Making of The Mist", "Taming the Beast: Shooting Scene 35", "Monsters Among Us: A Look at the Creature FX", "The Horror of It All: The Visual FX of The Mist", and "Drew Struzan: Appreciation of an Artist").

TV series

In November 2013, Bob Weinstein revealed that Darabont and he were developing a 10-part television series based on the film. In February 2016, Spike picked up the pilot. In April 2016, Spike ordered the series and Adam Bernstein directed the pilot, which premiered on June 22, 2017.

See also
 The Fog (novel), a 1975 novel by James Herbert

References

External links

 
 
 
 
 
 
 

2007 films
2007 horror films
2000s disaster films
2000s monster movies
2000s horror thriller films
2000s science fiction horror films
2000s supernatural horror films
American horror thriller films
American disaster films
American monster movies
American science fiction horror films
American supernatural horror films
Dimension Films films
The Weinstein Company films
Metro-Goldwyn-Mayer films
2000s English-language films
Fiction about familicide
Films scored by Mark Isham
Films based on works by Stephen King
Films based on American horror novels
Films directed by Frank Darabont
Films set in Maine
Films shot in Louisiana
Giant monster films
Murder in films
Films about parallel universes
Films with screenplays by Frank Darabont
Films critical of religion
Films based on novellas
2000s American films
Films about human sacrifice
Bridgton, Maine